The 1936 Estonian Football Championship was the 16th official football league season in Estonia. Eight teams took part in the league six from Tallinn, one from Pärnu and Narva. Each team played every opponent twice, once at home and once on the road, for total of 14 games. JS Estonia Tallinn successfully defended the title and clinched their third consecutive league title.

League table

Results

Top scorers

References

Estonian Football Championship
1
Estonia
Estonia